Global Expansion Summit is a business conference on corporate global expansion and foreign direct investment for business and government leaders. Focusing on organisations undergoing digital transformation, it is designed to help corporate decision makers find the best markets and business partners to facilitate successful business growth and efficiencies as they expand into new international markets.

Global Expansion Summit was founded in 2015 and was led by Fernando Faria, a former GSM Association director who led Mobile World Congress research and conference programmes. Fernando was behind the innovaBRICS event from 2012 to 2014, which discussed investment, innovation and business expansion in the BRICS countries.

History 
Fernando founded innovaBRICS in 2011 and organized the first edition in September 2012 at the BAFTA, in Piccadilly, London. Prominent speakers included Sir Edward Lister, Deputy Mayor of London, Rob Davies, Minister of Trade and Industry from South Africa and Jim O'Neill, then Chairman of Goldman Sachs Asset Management and creator of the term BRIC. 

The second annual edition took place in October 2013 at law firm Hogan Lovells and featured speakers such as Anglo American CEO Mark Cutifani, Rwandan Finance Minister Claver Gatete and South African Finance Minister Pravin Gordhan.

The third annual edition of innovaBRICS took place in October 2014. It was sponsored and hosted by Deloitte and featured speakers such as Deloitte Global Chairman Steve Almond, Minister in the Presidency of South Africa Jeff Radebe and Standard Chartered Chairman Sir John Peace.

Funding and expansion 
After securing funding from a venture capital firm in New York the company, with new investors on board, decided to rebrand the event to Global Expansion Summit, therefore expanding the concept to include geographical expansion opportunities globally.

The fourth edition of the event, first under Global Expansion Summit name, took place in October 2016 at the Intercontinental O2 and hosted 900 attendees, a 4-fold growth from the last edition of innovaBRICS. It featured 120 speakers from companies around the world who were seeking advice and connections to improve their global footprint.

The fifth edition took place on 18–20 June 2017, at the same venue and had a record 1,100 attendees.

Notable speakers 
Speakers from 30+ countries ranging from blue chip companies like Coca-Cola to high-growth tech companies like Uber shared their insights at the event. Here is a non-exhaustive list:

 Jim O'Neill, Chairman of Goldman Sachs Asset Management
 Yi Xiaozhun, Deputy Director General, WTO
 Mari Kiviniemi, Deputy Secretary-General, OECD
 Pravin Gordhan, Minister of Finance of South Africa
 Sir John Peace, Chairman of Standard Chartered Bank
 Steve Almond, Global Chairman, Deloitte
 Zhou Ziaoming, Minister Counsellor, Chinese Embassy in London
 Mark Cutifani, CEO, Anglo American
 Jambu Palaniapan, General Manager EMEA, Uber
 Charles Race, President of Worldwide Operations, Okta
 David Cruickshank, Global Chairman, Deloitte
 Nilan Peiris, VP of Growth, Transferwise
 Shawn Xu, International Expansion, Square
 Helen Sutton, VP Enterprise Northern Europe, DocuSign
 Alex McCracken, Managing Director, Silicon Valley Bank
 Beto Richa, Governor of Parana State, Brazil
 Denzil Samuels, Global Head of Channels, Business Development & Ventures, GE Digital
 Dr Remo Gerber, CEO UK & Western Europe, Gett
 Laurence Kemball Cook, CEO and Founder, Pavegen

References

Business conferences